Russograptis albulata is a species of moth of the family Tortricidae. It is found in Ethiopia, where it is only known from the Bale Mountains.

The wingspan is about 20 mm. The ground colour of the forewings is whitish with traces of greyish fasciae and with dull brown markings. The hindwings are pale brownish.

Etymology
The species name refers to colouration of the forewings and is derived from Latin albulata (meaning whitish).

References

Moths described in 2010
Tortricini
Moths of Africa
Taxa named by Józef Razowski